Vietnam Veterans Against the War (VVAW) is an American tax-exempt non-profit organization and corporation founded in 1967 to oppose the United States policy and participation in the Vietnam War. VVAW says it is a national veterans' organization that campaigns for peace, justice, and the rights of all United States military veterans. It publishes a twice-yearly newsletter, The Veteran; this was earlier published more frequently as 1st Casualty (1971–1972) and then as Winter Soldier (1973–1975).

VVAW identifies as anti-war, although not in the pacifistic sense.  Membership has varied greatly, from almost 25,000 veterans during the height of the war to fewer than 2,000 since the late 20th century. The VVAW is widely considered to be among the most influential anti-war organizations of the American Vietnam War era.

History

Founding

Vietnam Veterans Against War began as a placard slogan in the staging area for the April 15, 1967 Spring Mobilization to End the War anti-war demonstration in New York City, in which 400,000 protesters participated. About 20 veterans of the Vietnam War gathered under that impromptu banner, including Jan Barry Crumb, a West Point dropout who had served in the war as a radio specialist in an Army unit of a fixed-wing supply aircraft.

Following the conclusion of the march, Crumb and five others got together to form a new anti-war organization of veterans of the unpopular foreign military conflict. Beginning with a desk and a telephone in the office of the Fifth Avenue Vietnam Peace Parade Committee in New York City, the formal VVAW organization was formed.

The VVAW's website summarizes its history, in part indicating that:

According to VVAW, its founders organized discussions for veterans on readjustment issues in 1970. This was a predecessor to readjustment counselling at modern Vet Centers. The group helped draft legislation for education and job programs, and assisted veterans with post-war health care through the United States Department of Veterans Affairs (VA) hospital system, including assisting victims of Agent Orange and other chemical agents. The VVAW advocated amnesty for war resisters.

Membership size
The fluctuating membership size has had varied estimates. The organization remained small until late 1969 when it gained several hundred new members. With the Nixon administration's decision to invade Cambodia and the Kent State shootings in 1970, VVAW's visibility increased, and they attracted new members, increasing from 1,500 to almost 5,000.

Membership passed 8,500 by January 1971, and thousands more flocked to the organization after Playboy Magazine donated a full-page VVAW ad in its February edition. The national televised coverage of VVAW's week-long April 1971 protest in Washington, D.C., and smaller protests in subsequent months brought attention.

A Federal Bureau of Investigation informant within the organization noted in March 1971 that membership had grown from 1,500 to over 12,000 in the past four months. An article in Ramparts, that year said  VVAW had at that time approximately 11,000 members and employed 26 regional coordinators.

Higher estimates exist, including a claim of 20,000 members for 1971. The organization has claimed a peak membership of over 30,000. Counting non-veteran supporters, VVAW had "roughly 50,000" members.

By 1972, negotiations at the Paris peace talks were in full swing, signaling the beginning of the end of the war, meaning the end of VVAW's primary mission. Membership in the organization declined, and the leadership began to consider broader purposes to support veterans. Membership requirements were relaxed, and political differences arose as new members fought with old about direction. By 1973 VVAW had several thousand members. With internal struggles still threatening the group, 2,000 members demonstrated in Washington DC in July 1974, demanding universal amnesty for draft resisters and deserters, and universal discharge with benefits for all Vietnam veterans.

Historian Andrew E. Hunt concluded, "Detractors have always cited numbers when criticizing VVAW. At the pinnacle of VVAW's success in 1972, membership rolls listed almost 25,000 card carriers, or fewer than 1 percent of all eligible Vietnam era veterans. ... By emphasizing the low percentage of Vietnam veterans who paid dues to VVAW, opponents have sought to dismiss the significance and impact of the organization."

Notable VVAW-sponsored events

Operation RAW 
During the Labor Day weekend of September 4–7, 1970, Operation RAW ("Rapid American Withdrawal") took place. It was a three-day protest march from Morristown, New Jersey, to Valley Forge State Park in Pennsylvania by over 200 veterans. They were joined by members of "Nurses for Peace" and other peace groups. The march was designed to dramatize a Vietnam-type search and destroy mission as they passed through numerous towns. Upon entering each town along the march, the group made sweeps, took and interrogated prisoners, seized property and cleared homes with the aid of previously planted "guerrilla theater" actors portraying civilians. The 86-mile-long march culminated in a four-hour rally at Valley Forge attended by more than 1,500 people. The honorary commander was retired Army Brigadier General Hugh B. Hester. Sponsors included United States Senators George McGovern and Edmund Muskie, Rep. John Conyers, Paul O'Dwyer, Mark Lane, and Donald Sutherland. Scheduled speakers were John Kerry, Joe Kennedy, Rev. James Bevel, Mark Lane, Jane Fonda, and Sutherland. Congressman Allard Lowenstein, Mike Lerner, and Army First Lt. Louis Font also spoke.

Winter Soldier investigation

In January 1971, VVAW sponsored the Winter Soldier Investigation to gather and present testimony from soldiers about war crimes being committed in Southeast Asia; they intended to demonstrate these resulted from  American war policies. The event was boycotted by much of the mainstream media, although the Detroit Free Press covered it daily; its journalists began their own investigations to follow the testimony. They found no fraudulent participants or fraudulent testimony.

Veterans applying to participate in the investigation were asked if they had witnessed or participated in any of the following: search and destroy missions, crop destruction, and POW mistreatment.

This event was estimated to have cost the VVAW $50,000–$75,000. Funds were raised by several celebrity peace activists; actress Jane Fonda gained more than $10,000 in donations for this cause from 54 college campuses.  Winter Soldier Investigation testimonies were read into the Congressional Record by Senator Mark Hatfield (R-OR). In 1972, VVAW continued antiwar protests, and released Winter Soldier, a 16mm black-and-white documentary film showing participants giving testimony at the 1971 hearing, as well as footage of the Dewey Canyon III week of protest events. This film is on limited distribution and is available on DVD.

Dewey Canyon III – Washington, D.C., April 1971

This peaceful anti-war protest organized by VVAW was named after two short military invasions of Laos by US and South Vietnamese forces. Dubbed "Operation Dewey Canyon III," it took place in Washington, D.C, April 19–23, 1971. Participants said it was "a limited incursion into the country of Congress." This week of protest events gained much greater media publicity and Vietnam veterans participation than earlier events.

Led by Gold Star Mothers (mothers of soldiers killed in war), more than 1,100 veterans marched across the Lincoln Memorial Bridge to the Arlington National Cemetery gate, just beneath the Tomb of the Unknown Soldier. Reverend Jackson H. Day, who had a few days earlier resigned his military chaplainship, conducted a memorial service for their fellows. He said:

The gate to the cemetery had been closed and locked upon word of their impending arrival; the Gold Star mothers placed the wreaths outside the gate and departed. The march re-formed and continued to the Capitol, with Congressman Pete McCloskey joining the procession en route. McCloskey and fellow Representatives Bella Abzug, Don Edwards, Shirley Chisholm, Edmund Muskie and Ogden Reid addressed the large crowd and expressed support. VVAW members defied a Justice Department-ordered injunction against camping on the Mall and set up an installation. Later that day, the District Court of Appeals lifted the injunction. Some members visited their Congressmen to lobby against the U.S. participation in the war. The VVAW presented Congress with a 16-point suggested resolution for ending the war.

On April 20, 1971, 200 veterans listened to hearings by the Senate Foreign Relations Committee on proposals to end the war. Other veterans, still angry at the insult to the Gold Star Mothers when they were refused entry to Arlington National Cemetery the previous day, marched back to the front gate. After initial refusal of entry, the veterans were finally allowed in. Veterans performed guerrilla theater on the Capitol steps, re-enacting combat scenes and search and destroy missions from Vietnam. Later that evening, Democratic Senators Claiborne Pell and Philip Hart held a fund-raising party for the veterans. During the party it was announced that Chief Justice Warren Burger of the United States Supreme Court had reversed the decision of the Court of Appeals and reinstated the injunction. The veterans were given until 4:30 the following afternoon to break camp and leave the National Mall. This was the fastest reversal of an Appeals Court decision in the Supreme Court's history.

On April 21, more than 50 veterans marched to The Pentagon, attempting to surrender as war criminals. A Pentagon spokesman took their names and turned them away. Veterans continued to meet with and lobby their congressional representatives. Senator Ted Kennedy spent the day speaking with the veterans. The guerrilla theater re-enactments were moved to the steps of the Justice Department. Many veterans were prepared to be arrested for camping on the National Mall, but none were, as park police defied orders to make arrests. Headlines the following day read, "Vets Overrule Supreme Court."

On April 22, a large group of veterans demonstrated on the steps of the Supreme Court, saying that the Supreme Court should have ruled on the constitutionality of the war. The veterans sang "God Bless America" and 110 were arrested for disturbing the peace, and were later released. John Kerry, as VVAW spokesman, testified against the war for two hours in front of the Senate Foreign Relations Committee before a packed room. The veterans lobbied all day on Capitol. A Washington District Court judge dissolved his injunction order, rebuking the Justice Department lawyers for requesting the court order and then not enforcing it. Veterans staged a candlelight march around the White House, while carrying a huge American flag upside down in the historic international signal of distress.

On Friday, April 23, more than 800 veterans individually tossed their medals, ribbons, discharge papers, and other war mementos on the steps of the U.S. Capitol, rejecting the Vietnam War and the significance of those awards. Among those that threw medals were Sen. John Kerry. According to internal White House memos between John Dean and Charles Colson, they had no idea how to handle the discarded medals and finally passed them on to the Congressional Model of Honor Society. Several hearings in Congress were held that week regarding atrocities committed in Vietnam and the U.S. media's inaccurate coverage of the war. There were also hearings on proposals to end the United States' participation in the war. The vets planted a tree on the mall as part of a ceremony symbolizing the veterans' wish to preserve life and the environment.
   
Senators George McGovern and Mark Hatfield helped arrange at least $50,000 in fundraising for Dewey Canyon III. The VVAW paid $94,000 to advertise this event in the April 11, 1971 New York Times.

Walter Reed Memorial Service
In May 1971, the VVAW and former Army chaplain Reverend Jackson Day conducted a service for veterans at the Walter Reed Army Medical Center. Patients were brought into the chapel in wheelchairs. The service included time for individual prayers or public confession, and many veterans took the floor to recount things they had done or seen for which they felt guilt or anger. This was the last service performed by Day for nearly two decades.

Operation POW
Operation POW, organized by the VVAW in Massachusetts, expressed the imprisonment of Americans by the war years and honor for American POWs held captive by North Vietnam. Over the 1971 Memorial Day weekend, veterans and supporters marched from Concord, Massachusetts to a rally on Boston Common. They invoked the spirit of the American Revolution by spending successive nights at the sites of the Battle of Lexington and Concord and the Battle of Bunker Hill.

The organizers' request to camp on the historic Lexington, Massachusetts Green was declined by the town. The VVAW and residents who supported them camped there anyway. At 2:30 a.m. on May 30, local and state police awoke and arrested 441 demonstrators for trespassing. They were transported on school buses to spend the rest of the night at the Lexington Public Works Garage. Julian Soshnick, an attorney who represented the  Boston Strangler, was among those who volunteered to represent the demonstrators. He worked out a deal with Concord Court Judge John Forte. The protesters later paid a $5 fine each and were released. The mass arrests caused a community backlash and eventually resulted in positive coverage for the VVAW.

Statue of Liberty occupations
On December 26, 1971, fifteen VVAW activists barricaded and occupied the Statue of Liberty for two days to bring attention to their cause. Simultaneous protests took place at other sites across the country, such as the historic Betsy Ross House in Philadelphia (for 45 minutes) and Travis Air Force Base in California (for 12 hours). VVAW members in California also briefly occupied the South Vietnam Government consulate in San Francisco. In 1976 VVAW members occupied the Statue of Liberty a second time to bring renewed attention to veteran issues.

Kansas City meeting
During a four-day series of meetings in Kansas City, Missouri on November 12–15, 1971, Scott Camil, a radical VVAW southern coordinator, proposed assassinating the most conservative members of United States Congress, and other powerful opponents of the antiwar movement. According to interviews with VVAW members, Camil suggested "The Phoenix Project," named after the original Phoenix Program, CIA operations during the Vietnam War to assassinate the Viet Cong. Camil's Phoenix Project targeted the Southern senatorial leadership who were backing the war, including John Tower, Strom Thurmond, and John Stennis.

Camil later said:

The plan was voted down, although there's a "difference of opinion" as to how close the vote was. It is not known if John Kerry, a 2004 presidential candidate who was Secretary of State under President Barack Obama, attended this meeting. Kerry's campaign said he was not there and had already resigned from VVAW.

Post-Vietnam War activities
By 1973, US combat involvement in Vietnam ended. VVAW changed its emphasis to include advocating amnesty for draft resisters and dissenters. President Jimmy Carter eventually granted an amnesty in 1980.

VVAW members also worked to gain veterans' treatment and benefits for major Vietnam-related health conditions, namely, posttraumatic stress disorder and the effects of exposure to Agent Orange.

As early as 1970, VVAW initiated "rap groups" to help veterans readjust: these were venues for veterans to discuss troubling aspects of the war, their disillusionment, and experiences after returning home. They gained the aid of prominent psychiatrists Dr. Robert Jay Lifton and Dr. Chaim F. Shatan to direct their sessions. VVAW's work contributed to "Post-Vietnam Syndrome" being recognized in 1980 as posttraumatic stress disorder by the American Psychiatric Association in its Diagnostic and Statistical Manual of Mental Disorders. Such discussion groups are often used in the VVAW "rap group" treatment methods are the basis for treating PTSD today.

In 1978 Maude de Victor, a Chicago Veterans Administration caseworker, noticed a pattern in cancers and other illnesses suffered by Vietnam veterans. She linked those illnesses with exposure to herbicides such as Agent Orange, and its dioxin contaminants. VVAW led veterans organizations in the struggle to force the government to test, treat and compensate the victims of those poisons. Congress mandated a study of Agent Orange in 1979.

Veterans separately filed suit against the herbicide manufacturers, Dow Chemical and Monsanto, in 1982. Two years later the companies settled the suit for $180 million to compensate what at that time were more than 200,000 claimants.

Mainstream veterans groups had tended to be suspicious of Vietnam veterans who protested against the war, regarding them as "crybabies and losers" in general. They particularly thought the VVAW members were unpatriotic and anti-American. Vietnam Veterans of America was not founded until 1978 by VVAW member Robert Muller. In 1990 the American Legion and VVA joined the cause of Vietnam veterans, filing suit against the government for having failed to conduct the study ordered by Congress in 1979.

Several VVAW members moved on to prominent positions in society. In 1978 Bobby Muller co-founded the Vietnam Veterans of America. John Kerry was elected as Lt. Governor of Massachusetts in 1982, and as a US Senator in 1984. Ron Kovic wrote his autobiography, Born on the Fourth of July. It was adapted as a 1989 movie and won several Academy Awards.

Reunions are scheduled every five years for members and alumni; the 1992 event attracted hundreds of veterans to commemorate the 25th anniversary of the founding. VVAW continues to organize programs and fundraising events in support of veterans, peace, and social justice. "

Revolutionary Communist Party involvement
In 1973, after months of heated debate, the VVAW changed its name to VVAW/WSO (Winter Soldier Organization), and opened its membership to non-veterans to increase its base. Members of Bob Avakian's militant Revolutionary Communist Party gained influential positions in the VVAW. The RCP group formed a separate organization, Vietnam Veterans Against the War Anti-Imperialist (VVAW-AI). VVAW filed and won a lawsuit prohibiting the RCP group from using the VVAW name, logos and materials. Deep animosity still exists between the two organizations.

VVAW has survived the conflict with RCP and changes after the end of the war. Historian Andrew Hunt said it was "an ineffectual fragment of its former self. ... VVAW never ceased to exist. It split, dwindled, and underwent additional transformation. Yet it did not fold." it also gained important extensions of medical treatment for veterans, influencing treatment as well of current military members.

See also
 Brian Willson
 Camillo Mac Bica
 Concerned Officers Movement
 Court-martial of Howard Levy
 David M. Shoup
 Donald W. Duncan
 FTA Show - 1971 anti-Vietnam War road show for GIs
 F.T.A. - documentary film about the FTA Show
 Fort Hood Three
 Fulbright Hearing
 GIs Against Fascism
 GI Coffeehouses
 GI Underground Press
 Going Upriver
 Gold Star Families for Peace
 About Face: Veterans Against the War
 Jeff Sharlet (Vietnam antiwar activist)
 List of anti-war organizations
 Opposition to United States involvement in the Vietnam War
 Presidio mutiny
 Sir! No Sir!, a documentary about the anti-war movement within the ranks of the United States Armed Forces
 Movement for a Democratic Military
 Stop Our Ship (SOS) anti-Vietnam War movement in and around the U.S. Navy
 The Spitting Image, a 1998 book by Vietnam veteran and sociology professor Jerry Lembcke which disproves the widely believed narrative that American soldiers were spat upon and insulted by antiwar protesters
 Tiger Force (commandos)
 Veterans For Peace
 Waging Peace in Vietnam
 Winter Soldier Investigation

Footnotes

Further reading
 Cortright, David. Soldiers in Revolt. Haymarket Books: 2006. .
 W.D. Ehrhart. Passing Time: Memoir of a Vietnam Veteran Against the War. University of Massachusetts Press: 2nd edition, 1995. 
 Fink, Bob. Vietnam, A View from the Walls: History of the Anti-Vietnam War U.S. Protest ,  .
 
 Kerry, John, and Vietnam Veterans Against the War. The New Soldier. Macmillan Publishing Company: 1971. 
 Lemire, Elise.  'Battle Green Vietnam: The 1971 March on Concord, Lexington, and Boston.' Penn Press, 2021 
 Nicosia, Gerald. Home to War: A History of the Vietnam Veterans' Movement. Crown Publishers: 2001. 
 Retzer, Joseph David. War and Political Ideology: The Roots of Radicalism Among Vietnam Veterans. Doctoral thesis. Yale University. 1976.
 Vietnam Veterans Against the War, Program of Vietnam Veterans Against the War. Chicago: VVAW National Office, n.d. [1975].

Documentary films
 1972 – Winter Soldier. Documentary directed by the Winterfilm Collective.
 1973 – Operation Last Patrol. Directed by Frank Cavestani and Catherine Leroy.
 2004 – Going Upriver: The Long War of John Kerry. Directed by George Butler.
 2005 – Sir! No Sir!. Directed by David Zeiger.

External links
 VVAW web site
 Dewey Canyon III Rev. Jackson Day
 History of the U.S. War in Vietnam By Barry Romo, Pete Zastrow & Joe Miller
 The Winter Soldier Investigation sponsored by VVAW
 
 Blood Debt Members of Vietnam Veterans Against the War and Vietnamese victims come together to assess the legacy of Agent Orange (warning: graphic images – viewer discretion advised). From the Chicago FreeSpeechZone
 VVAW Coordinator Barry Romo's speech against the Iraq War and cutting of veteran health care funding
 Lexington Historical Society
 GI Antiwar Movement films, audio clips, photos and libraries
 My Lai Peace Park Project 
 Vietnam Vet and VVAW leader Terry DuBose on Rag Radio Interviewed by Thorne Dreyer, June 17, 2011 [55:42]
 Articles about VVAW and Winter Soldier at The Rag Blog
 Sir! No Sir!, a film about GI resistance to the Vietnam War
 A Matter of Conscience – GI Resistance During the Vietnam War
 Waging Peace in Vietnam – US Soldiers and Veterans Who Opposed the War
 Waging Peace in Vietnam Interviews with GI resisters
1974-76 issues of the VVAW's newsletter

Organizations established in 1967
Opposition to United States involvement in the Vietnam War
Anti–Vietnam War groups
Political advocacy groups in the United States
Veterans' organizations opposed to the Iraq War
American military personnel of the Vietnam War
American veterans' organizations
Resistance Inside the Army